Maamadurai is a 2007 Indian Tamil-language drama film directed by newcomer K. K. Krishnan. The film stars Vaasan Karthik, son of comedian Singamuthu and Midhuna, younger sister of Rajashree in lead roles. The music was composed by Karthik Raja. The film was released in 2007 to mixed reviews.

Plot
The story starts in Madurai railway station, where Saravanan is a coolie and he was accompanied by his friends Karunas and Mayilsami. Saravanan is go-header spends his life like that with his friends. One day Saravanan finds a mobile phone lying unclaimed in railway station and he learns that it belongs to Nandini. Then Saravanan will go to Nandini's home and hand over the phone, by the time he discovered that Nandini is the sister of politician 'One Way' Kumar.

The intro between Saravanan and Nandini grew into friendship and later on it became love. Kumar is aware of his sister love affair, so he tries to separate the couple by means of force, even then Saravanan and Nandini love was steady. At another end, Saravanan discovered his mother's presence through a church father, father helping Saravanan to find his mother.

Cast

Vaasan Karthik as Saravanan
Midhuna as Nandini
Vadivelu as Thangavelu
Thambi Ramaiah as Osamma's husband
Crane Manohar as Thangavelu's neighbour
Benjamin as Thangavelu's friend
Karunas as Aarumugam
Mayilsamy
Kottaikumar as 'One Way' Kumar
Singamuthu
Delhi Ganesh
Seetha as Sivagami
Erode Sounder as Sivagami's father
Besant Ravi as Thangavelu's enemy
Nizhagal Ravi
C. R. Saraswathi
Balu Anand
Madhan Bob
Halwa Vasu
Periya Karuppu Thevar
Scissor Manohar

Soundtrack
The music was composed by Karthik Raja. The track "Sorgam Madhuvile" from the Kamal Haasan-starrer Sattam En Kaiyil was remixed in this film.

Release 
S. R. Ashok Kumar of The Hindu wrote that "If the director had bothered to join the loose ends, a reasonably good film would have emerged".

References

External links

2007 films
2000s Tamil-language films
Films scored by Karthik Raja